Wicklow is a town in Ireland.

Wicklow may also refer to:

County Wicklow
Wicklow County Council
Wicklow Mountains
Wicklow GAA
Wicklow Way
Wicklow Gap

Constituencies
The current parliamentary constituency bearing the County's name is:
Wicklow (Dáil constituency), a 5-seat (initially 3-seat, then 4-seat) constituency represented in Dáil Éireann since 1923

The previous constituencies were:

Until 1800
Wicklow Borough (Parliament of Ireland constituency)
Wicklow County (Parliament of Ireland constituency)

1801–1885
 Wicklow (UK Parliament constituency), a single-seat constituency used for the election to the United Kingdom Parliament in 1918, but whose MP took his seat instead as a TD in the first Dáil Éireann

1885–1922
 East Wicklow (UK Parliament constituency), a single-seat UK constituency used for election to the United Kingdom Parliament, but whose MP in 1918 took his seat instead as a TD in the first Dáil Éireann
 West Wicklow (UK Parliament constituency), a single-seat constituency UK used for elections to the United Kingdom Parliament, but whose MP in 1918 took his seat instead as a TD in the first Dáil Éireann

1921–1923
 Kildare–Wicklow (Dáil constituency), a 5-seat constituency represented in Dáil Éireann 1921–1923